Bill Orr (born 23 May 1983 in Clydebank) is a Scottish football Manager/Coach, who is currently Assistant Manager of East Kilbride Football Club. Orr has held similar positions at Stirling Albion FC, Queens Park FC and Greenock Juniors FC. Orr managed in the lower leagues for over 12 years prior to moving into Senior Football.

References

1983 births
Living people